Associazione Sportiva Pro Gorizia is an Italian association football club located in Gorizia, Friuli-Venezia Giulia. It plays in Eccellenza. Its colors are blue and white.

The club was founded in 1923 and spent two seasons in Serie B.

References

External links
Official homepage

Football clubs in Italy
Football clubs in Friuli-Venezia Giulia
Gorizia
Association football clubs established in 1923
Serie B clubs
Serie C clubs
Serie D clubs
1923 establishments in Italy
A.S. Pro Gorizia